Joanna Evans (born 25 July 1997) is a Bahamian competitive swimmer who specializes in freestyle. She qualified for the 2016 Summer Olympics in Rio de Janeiro in the 200, 400, and 800 meter freestyle events. In the 200 and 400 meter, she set new  national records.

Evans studied Engineering at the University of Texas at Austin. In 2014, she was named Bahamas Junior Swimmer of the Year.

She competed at the 2020 Summer Olympics.

References

External links

1997 births
Living people
People from Freeport, Bahamas
Bahamian female swimmers
Bahamian female freestyle swimmers
Olympic swimmers of the Bahamas
Swimmers at the 2016 Summer Olympics
Swimmers at the 2014 Summer Youth Olympics
Pan American Games competitors for the Bahamas
Swimmers at the 2015 Pan American Games
Commonwealth Games competitors for the Bahamas
Swimmers at the 2014 Commonwealth Games
Swimmers at the 2018 Commonwealth Games
Texas Longhorns women's swimmers
Universiade medalists in swimming
Universiade medalists for the Bahamas
Central American and Caribbean Games gold medalists for the Bahamas
Central American and Caribbean Games medalists in swimming
Competitors at the 2018 Central American and Caribbean Games
Medalists at the 2017 Summer Universiade
Swimmers at the 2020 Summer Olympics